Jack L. August (January 7, 1954 – January 20, 2017) was Arizona's state historian. He was considered to be an expert on the politics of water.

Early life
August grew up in Philadelphia, Pennsylvania, the eldest of five children. As a boy was friends with the film director John Waters, with whom he attended a private elementary school. August was also attacked by a bear as a child, leaving a tiny scar, from falling down to hide from the bear in his parents car.

Education 
August attended Yale University, on a full scholarship as a swimmer, from which he received his bachelor's degree in history. He later received a master's degree from the University of Arizona and a Ph.D from the University of New Mexico.

Career 
August was named historian and director of Institutional Advancement at the Arizona Capitol Museum in early 2016.

Selected publications 
Desert Bloom or Desert Doom?: Carl Hayden and the Origins of the Central Arizona Project, 1922-1964. Prescott, Arizona: Sharlot Hall Museum, 1996. 
Vision in the Desert: Carl Hayden and Hydropolitics in the American Southwest. Fort Worth: Texas Christian University Press, 1999. 
Dividing Western Waters: Mark Wilmer and Arizona V. California. Fort Worth, TX: TCU Press, 2007.  
Snell and Wilmer: An Institutional Biography of the New West. Fort Worth, TX: TCU Press, 2013.   
The Norton Trilogy. Fort Worth, TX: TCU Press, 2013.

References

External links

1954 births
2017 deaths
Historians of Arizona
Historians of the American West
Public historians
Yale College alumni
University of Arizona alumni
University of New Mexico alumni
American historians
Yale Bulldogs men's swimmers